Konstantinos Economidis (born 2 November 1977) is a retired professional Greek tennis player and a former Greek No. 1. In 2007, he qualified for the French Open and defeated Australian Chris Guccione in the first round before losing to Tommy Robredo in the second round. He achieved his career-high singles ranking of world No. 112 in February 2007 and has won 5 Challenger titles.

Despite playing relatively few ATP Tour-level matches, Economidis has impressively managed to post a positive record in both singles and doubles.

Singles Titles

Grand Slam performance timeline

References

External links
 
 
 
 Economidis World ranking history
 Greek Men Recent Match Results

1977 births
Living people
Greek male tennis players
Olympic tennis players of Greece
Sportspeople from Thessaloniki
Tennis players at the 2004 Summer Olympics
Mediterranean Games gold medalists for Greece
Competitors at the 2001 Mediterranean Games
Mediterranean Games medalists in tennis